WOOL (91.5 FM, "Black Sheep Radio") is a radio station broadcasting a Freeform music and talk format. Licensed to Bellows Falls, Vermont, United States, the station is owned by Great Falls Community Broadcasting Company. It is a community radio station. WOOL began broadcast on March 9, 2014, implementing a Class A noncommercial educational license granted by the Federal Communications Commission as a successor station to WOOL-LP (100.1 FM).

See also
List of community radio stations in the United States

References

External links
 Black Sheep Radio Online

OOL (FM)
Bellows Falls, Vermont
Community radio stations in the United States
Radio stations established in 2014
2014 establishments in Vermont